Luis Enrique Cessa (born April 25, 1992) is a Mexican professional baseball pitcher for the Cincinnati Reds of Major League Baseball (MLB). He previously played in MLB for the New York Yankees.

Professional career

New York Mets
Cessa signed with the New York Mets organization as an international free agent on July 9, 2008. He made his professional debut in 2009 with the Dominican Summer League Mets, hitting .191/.379/.258 with 1 home run and 9 RBI in 34 games. The following season, Cessa returned to the team and hit .162/.230/.191 with no home runs and 3 RBI in 23 games. Cessa was a shortstop his first two seasons before transitioning into a pitcher in 2011. Cessa made his professional debut as a pitcher with the DSL Mets in 2011, and also pitched for the rookie-level GCL Mets, accumulating a 4–3 record and 3.19 ERA in 15 games. In 2012, Cessa pitched in 13 games for the Low-A Brooklyn Cyclones, registering a 5–4 record and 2.49 ERA. The following season, Cessa recorded an 8–4 record and 3.12 ERA in 21 games for the Single-A Savannah Sand Gnats. In 2014, Cessa spent the season with the High-A St. Lucie Mets, also appearing in one game for the Double-A Binghamton Mets, and pitched to a 7–9 record and 4.26 ERA in 21 games. Cessa began the 2015 season in Binghamton, and received a promotion to the Triple-A Las Vegas 51s after logging a 2.56 ERA in 13 games for Binghamton.

Detroit Tigers
On July 31, 2015, the Mets traded Cessa and Michael Fulmer to the Detroit Tigers in exchange for Yoenis Céspedes. Cessa finished the year with the Triple-A Toledo Mud Hens, posting a 1–3 record and 5.97 ERA with 34 strikeouts in 37.2 innings of work. Cessa was added to the Tigers' 40-man roster after the season.

New York Yankees
On December 9, 2015, the Tigers traded Cessa and Chad Green to the New York Yankees for Justin Wilson. Cessa was named to the Yankees' Opening Day roster in 2016. He made his major league debut for the Yankees on April 8. He pitched two innings, allowing two hits, one home run, and two strikeouts as the Yankees were shut out by the Detroit Tigers, 4–0.  The Yankees optioned Cessa to the Scranton/Wilkes-Barre RailRiders of the Triple-A International League on April 15, 2016, in exchange for Tyler Olson. On May 17, the Yankees recalled Cessa for AAA Scranton/WB. On June 7, the Yankees optioned him to Triple-A Scranton/Wilkes-Barre. On June 26, the Yankees recalled Cessa from Scranton/. On June 29, Cessa earned his first Major League win, pitching 3 innings of 1-run relief. Cessa finished his rookie season with a 4–4 record and 4.35 ERA in 17 appearances.

Cessa began the 2017 season with Scranton/Wilkes-Barre, before being recalled in June. In August Cessa was placed on the disabled list after making a spot start for the Yankees, the rib cage injury would end his season. Cessa had recorded a 4.75 ERA in 10 games before his injury. Cessa again spent most of the 2018 season with Scranton/Wilkes-Barre and was used in a variety of roles by the Yankees in the major leagues. Cessa started 5 games and finished 6, while recording a pair of three inning saves. He finished the year with a 1–4 record and 5.24 ERA.

Cessa spent the 2019 season as a full-time reliever for the Yankees, pitching to a 4.11 ERA and a 8.3 K/9 in 81 innings pitched.

On July 4, 2020, it was announced that Cessa had tested positive for COVID-19. In 16 games for the Yankees in the pandemic shortened 2020 season, Cessa recorded a 3.32 ERA and 7.1 K/9 in 16 appearances.

In 29 appearances for the Yankees in 2021, Cessa posted a  3–1 record with a 2.82 ERA and 31 strikeouts in 38.1 innings pitched.

Cincinnati Reds
On July 28, 2021, the Yankees traded Cessa and Justin Wilson to the Cincinnati Reds in exchange for Jason Parker. In 24 appearances for the Reds, Cessa went 2–1 with a 2.05 ERA and 23 strikeouts.

On March 22, 2022, Cessa signed a $1.8 million contract with the Reds, avoiding salary arbitration.

Personal life
Cessa was born in Córdoba, Veracruz, but grew up in Cárdenas, Tabasco.

References

External links

1992 births
Baseball players from Tabasco
Baseball players from Veracruz
Binghamton Mets players
Brooklyn Cyclones players
Cincinnati Reds players
Dominican Summer League Mets players
Gulf Coast Mets players
Las Vegas 51s players
Living people
Major League Baseball pitchers
Major League Baseball players from Mexico
Mexican expatriate baseball players in the United States
Mexican people of Italian descent
New York Yankees players
People from Cárdenas, Tabasco
Savannah Sand Gnats players
Scranton/Wilkes-Barre RailRiders players
Sportspeople from Córdoba, Veracruz
St. Lucie Mets players
Toledo Mud Hens players
Mexican expatriate baseball players in the Dominican Republic
2023 World Baseball Classic players